There are several reportedly haunted locations in the Philippines. Reports of such haunted locations are part of ghostlore, which is a form of folklore. The entries are alphabetized.

Metro Manila

 Ateneo de Manila University: One of the most prestigious educational institutions of the country, ADMU is claimed by believers to be haunted.
 Balete Drive: A major residential avenue in the eastern part of New Manila, Quezon City, Balete Drive is noted as the site of several apparitions of a white lady, who is considered by believers to be the ghost of a teenage girl who was raped and killed by a taxi driver in the 1950s.
 Capitol Medical Center: A certain elevator of the hospital was reported to be haunted. Eyewitnesses claimed this off-limits elevator brought them to the basement, which once served as a morgue, instead of bringing them to their intended destination.

 De La Salle University: Due to its brutal Second World War-era history, DLSU is reportedly haunted. The university's Chapel of the Most Blessed Sacrament, which is housed inside St. La Salle Hall, witnessed the massacre of refugees and La Sallian brothers who sought shelter inside at the hands of the Imperial Japanese Army. The Bro. Connon Hall that houses the offices of the university's student organizations is reported by believing students to be haunted, by a female student who died after being trapped in the building's elevator. Other areas with reported paranormal activities are Bro. Andrew Gonzalez Hall, St. Mutien Marie Hall, and St. Joseph Hall.
 Fort Bonifacio Tenement: Built in 1963, it contains more than 700 units, one of which is Unit 771. Its current occupant, residing since 1989, claims it is haunted by the ghost of a wailing woman seeking for help. It was featured in the 2022 Halloween special of GMA Network's telemagazine program Kapuso Mo, Jessica Soho.
 Fort Santiago: This is a historic fortress in Intramuros, Manila, and said by believers to be haunted by ghosts of soldiers and civilian victims killed during World War II.
 Libingan ng mga Bayani: The cemetery is reported by believing patrolling soldiers to be haunted by assorted ghosts, some in uniform while others in civilian attire. 
 Malacañang Palace: The official residence and principal workplace of the President of the Philippines is considered by believers to be haunted by numerous ghosts such as those of the former presidents (Manuel Luis Quezón, Manuel Roxas, and Ramon Magsaysay), former presidential aides and attendants, those from the pre-Hispanic era, people who were killed during the Second World War, and a black lady peering out towards Pasig River from a window of the Mabini Hall late at night. Areas of reputed paranormal activities include the Mabini Hall, Heroes Hall, Correspondence Office, New Executive Building, and the Music Room. A large balete tree stands at the main entrance to the Freedom Park (at the grounds of the Malacañang fronting the Administration and Executive Buildings), which was designated as a National Heritage Tree in 2011 but claimed by believers to be the home of a kapre.
 Manila Central Post Office: The building served as a crucial Japanese garrison during the Second World War, according to historian Gerard Lico. He speculated that as their last stronghold, the Japanese soldiers may have met their deaths there. Believing employees, past and present, claim of various residual hauntings from wartime period in the historic building. It was featured in the 2021 Halloween special of GMA Network's telemagazine program Kapuso Mo, Jessica Soho.

 Manila City Hall: Believing city hall employees claim of wandering specters after 6:00 p.m.. Paranormal experts who investigated in the area confirmed poltergeist activities, residual hauntings from Japanese-era ghosts and a woman believed to have died in the premises during World War II. Most of the hauntings are concentrated in the clock tower of the city hall. Believers also indicate its eerie casket-like shape when viewed from above (although some contend it resembles the shield of the Knights Templar).
 Manila Film Center: A major component of the Cultural Center of the Philippines, the facility was the site of a construction accident. Construction was rushed as the first Manila Film Festival neared, and on November 17, 1981 the scaffolding holding the fourth floor gave way, sending workers down to be entombed in the quick-drying cement. Project supervisor Betty Benitez ordered the work to continue, instead of retrieving the bodies of the dead workers, for fear of not meeting the deadline. Paranormal activities began on the day the construction resumed, with the deceased workers appearing themselves to their living colleagues. Usherettes who were invited on January 18, 1982, the day of the film festival, claimed to have felt cold presences and smelled mysterious odor in the backstage. Benitez herself perished in a bizarre car accident months after the events. Believers claim the spirits of the dead workers continue to indicate their presence in the theater. The facility, formerly abandoned due to its reputation, is now in use after restoration works.
 Miriam College: Believing students claim of the ghost of a nun in the ladies' restroom at the 2nd floor of the Caritas Building.

 Ozone Disco: A former discothèque in Quezon City that was the site of the worst fire in the Philippine history. The 1996 fire killed at least 162 people and injured at least 95. Phantom music and shadows of dancing figures were reported from its ruins, and hauntings allegedly spread to nearby Imperial Hotel as well. The discothèque building was demolished in 2015, and the site is now presently occupied by GoodAh!!!, a 24-hour diner, co-operated by Boy Abunda.  Abunda communicated with the spirits prior to the business' opening, and paranormal activities in the area were claimed to have greatly minimized ever since.
 Philippine National Bank – Pasay branch: The fifth floor of this Pasay branch of PNB at Roxas Boulevard was used as a morgue for the 16-to-25 victims of a fire at the Regent of Manila hotel on February 13, 1985. Exorcisms were conducted on the said floor at the requests of previous occupants because of frequent paranormal activities.
 Polytechnic University of the Philippines: The institution's Claro M. Recto Hall houses a small theater where the backstage rooms are the hot spots of an apparition of a burnt entity as confirmed by theater director and professor Segundo "Dodie" Dizon. The College of Engineering is also a paranormal hot spot where not only a ghost of a child and a white lady are said to appear but also the spirit of a deceased professor frequents the halls. ABS-CBN telemagazine program Magandang Gabi... Bayan featured the paranormal case of PUP in its 2005 Halloween special.
 Starmall Alabang: It is situated on the former site of the Alabang Cemetery. Believers claim ghosts haunting its theaters.

 University of the Philippines Diliman Campus: Its long history is said to be the reason of its alleged hauntings. Guerrero Theater, housed in the second floor of Palma Hall, supposedly hosts the spirit of a young theater actress who committed suicide after a newcomer obscured her recognition. Other areas of reported paranormal activity include the College of Music, the Vanguard Building, the College of Education, and Vinzons Hall.
University of the Philippines Manila Campus: The campus is one of the witnesses of World War II.
 University of Santo Tomas: Is reported by believers to be haunted, due to its long history that spans from the Spanish era. Santo Tomas also served as an internment camp during the Second World War wherein many of the prisoners of war were "enemy aliens", mostly Americans, living in the Philippines. Many prisoners died of starvation, illness, and other causes. The university is also a witness to unlucky students resorting to suicide, such as the female ghost in one of the ladies' restrooms in the Main Building. Former UST Rector Magnificus Rolando de la Rosa confirmed in an interview about an alleged mass grave located near the UST museum.

Independent cities (highly urbanized cities)

Baguio

Baguio, the largest city of northern Luzon and a noted tourist destination, is said to be highly haunted. There are several haunted locations scattered throughout the city, such as cemeteries, old hotels, and other sites where structures used to stand until the 1990 Luzon earthquake destroyed them, injuring and killing the people inside. The city was also the site of some of the most brutal atrocities committed during World War II. Such haunted locations include the following:
 Casa Vallejo: The oldest hotel in the city, it was built in 1909 to house key personnel of the Bureau of Public Works, before becoming a hotel in 1923. It is alleged that it served as a detention center for the German prisoners of war in 1917.
 Dominican Hill Retreat House: Commonly called Diplomat Hotel, it was originally a seminary and later converted into a hotel. Situated atop the Dominican Hill, it has been considered as the city's most haunted location as it was the site of numerous atrocities committed by the Japanese forces during World War II. Priests, nuns, and refugees who sought refuge from war were tortured, raped, and decapitated by the Japanese forces.
 Hotel Nevada: One of the city buildings destroyed in the 1990 Luzon earthquake. Dion Fernandez, a medium, claimed the spirits of the earthquake fatalities "have mercifully moved on".
 Hyatt Terraces Hotel: A 12-storey hotel that was destroyed in the 1990 Luzon earthquake. The destruction killed at least 50 people. Believers claim ghosts of those perished in the earthquake wandering the vacant site. Like the case of Hotel Nevada, Fernandez claims all spirits have left the area.
 Japanese Tunnels: A labyrinth of underground tunnels that were built by the Imperial Japanese Army. Several Japanese soldiers died inside the tunnels, and manifest themselves as silhouettes, disembodied voices and whispers. Generally "harmless" poltergeist activities such as touching people and pulling on hairs were also reported.
 Laperal White House: Also known as the Laperal Guesthouse, it was built by Roberto Laperal in the 1920s as a vacation home for his family. However, the Laperal family was reportedly plagued with a string of deadly tragedies since the mid-1920s, with many of the family members dying inside its premises of varying causes. During World War II, the Japanese soldiers occupied the house and used it as a garrison, where they reportedly committed various atrocities, such as torturing and killing suspected spies working for the United States and their allies. It was purchased in 2007 by the Filipino-Chinese business magnate Lucio Tan, becoming a museum of locally-made Filipino artworks based on bamboo and wood. Since December 26, 2022, it houses an upscale restaurant called "Joseph's Baguio" that focuses on French cuisine.
 Loakan Road: The access road to Loakan Airport, believers claim of a female vanishing hitchhiker (supposedly a rape victim) wandering the area. A tree that formerly stood in the middle segment of the road was the reputed home of the specter, and believers claim the DPWH employee who cut it down met his death by another falling tree.
 Philippine Military Academy: The military school of the Armed Forces of the Philippines (AFP) is reportedly haunted by various ghosts, including a faceless cadet not in proper attire roaming around the institution at night.
 Teacher's Camp: First established as a training site by American teachers (Thomasites), it is now training center for teachers in the country. It is alleged that it was built on the site of a battlefield of the former indigenous residents.

Cebu City

 Casa Gorordo Museum: It previously served as the family residence of Juan Gorordo, the first Filipino bishop of the Philippines. He died in the master's bedroom in 1934. Believers, however, claim of a female specter who is said to be the ghost of one of Gorordo's spinster sisters.
 Cebu Normal University: The university served as a garrison during the Japanese era.
 Escario Pension House: A four-storey building located on Escario Street. Believers claim that it is haunted; stories maintain that monthly a worker perished during its construction.
 Fort San Pedro: This historical military fort is claimed by believers to be haunted.
 Museo Sugbo: It is claimed by believers to be haunted, as it was formerly a prison during the Spanish colonial period (as the Cárcel de Cebú) and the Japanese occupation of the Philippines.
 Villalon Mansion: Located at the Capitol Site, it was once the residence of an affluent Cebuano family. Believers now claim of paranormal activities in the now-off-limits site, including a white lady.

Davao City

 Ateneo de Davao University – Matina campus: The campus is situated on site of a wartime-era Japanese airfield. Believing students, faculty, staff, and security personnel claim of ghosts of Japanese soldiers and of deceased students haunting the campus.
 Department of the Interior and Local Government (DILG) regional office: Believers claim this location is haunted by the kapre. Balete trees filled the area before being occupied by the residents, with the regional office of DILG as the present occupant.
 Francisco Bangoy International Airport: The former terminals of Davao City's main airport in Sasa district is now the home of several homeless families. Those believing occupants claim it is haunted by the deceased victims of the March 2003 bombing that killed 21 people.
 Palm Drive: A short road in Buhangin district whose south end is to the west of SSS Bajada and Southern Philippines Medical Center. Believers claim it is haunted by a brown lady said to be a housemaid of one of the residences along the street who was murdered during a robbery attempt.
 Si residence: The old residence of Si family at Champaca Street is claimed by believers to be haunted. Contrary to popular belief that they were massacred, however, the family moved to Manila in the mid-1990s.
 Talomo Beach: A row of retreat houses along the said beach are said by believers to be haunted by children who drowned along the shores of the beach.

Iloilo City
 Central Philippine University: Said by believers to be haunted due to the atrocities committed by the Japanese in the place during World War II. Many Americans who founded the university were killed by the Japanese troops.

Provinces

Bulacan

 Bahay na Pula (or Ilusorio Mansion): A World War II site in San Ildefonso, which the Imperial Japanese Army used as their barracks and became a place where so-called local comfort women were forced to work. It was demolished in 2016 due to a feuding internal conflict between the current members of the Ilusorio family.

Cavite

 Corregidor: Situated at the entrance of Manila Bay, this historic island is located near the southern tip of Bataan, though it is administered by Cavite City of the province of Cavite. Corregidor played a major role during World War II, during the invasion and liberation of the Philippines from Japanese forces. Its island and ruins are attested by believers to be actively haunted by phantom platoons, white ladies and disembodied voices of American and Japanese soldiers. One prominent structure in the island. the Malinta Tunnel was first used as a storage facility of the U.S. Army during World War II, but was later converted into a hospital where injured soldiers were treated. Shadows, unexplainable noises, moans, groans and cries from within its walls, sudden draft of winds as well as temperature changes have been reported to manifest in the tunnel.

Cebu

 Carcar City Museum: A 2-storey museum in Carcar showcasing cultural items of the city. Originally established in 1929 as a dispensary to serve the people in distant areas, it was later converted into a museum in 2008. According to local historians, the building during World War II served as torture facility by the Japanese forces in which suspected supporters of the guerrillas were drowned to their deaths at the now-deserted swimming pool.
 Lambusan Public Cemetery: Located in Barangay Lambusan, San Remigio, it is situated in one of the poorest areas of the northern sector of the province. Several of the remains of the deceased were reportedly piled in a common area, as their families and relatives had no more enough money to pay for the yearly rent of the tombs. Ghost sightings in the cemetery have been reported by believers.

La Union

 Pindangan Ruins (San Fernando, La Union).

Laguna

Agarao Gym, Paete A withess of World war II that former site of villages in Barangay Quinale JP Rizal Street and then 21st century become agarao court and MDRMMO offices and despite alleged a ghosts during night.
 Liceo de Majayjay: A Catholic school that is a witness to the events of WW1 and WW2. Built in the 1500s, it has many alleged hauntings in the school and church.
 Liceo de Paete: A Roman Church and School is a witness to the events of Second War, it many alleged spirits in Roman church and decapitated head in Library Room.
 Pakil Church: An Alcantara Church is witness during events Second War, then rebuild was done of 1980 to 1984, allegedly ghosts in area of bell tower 
 Sampiruhan, Calamba: This barangay is a witness to an atrocity in World War II, in which 70 people were brutally killed by the Japanese. The site of the massacre, marked by a candle-shaped monument, is claimed by believers to be haunted. It was featured in a Halloween special of telemagazine program Magandang Gabi... Bayan.
 Santa Cruz Mansion: A witness to the Second World War, it is near the Santa Cruz Bridge or also known as Malaking Tulay ng Santa Cruz. The Mansion was the house of former mayor or Santa Cruz. Fell into disuse after attempts to revive and restore the location for commercial and tourism use, and despite its alleged paranormal activities, is considered a heritage site looked after by a caretaker.
 University of the Philippines Los Baños Campus: A witness to the Second World War and the Japanese occupation. The Baker Memorial Hall was used as an internment camp of around 2,500 American and allied POWs and civilians 1943–1945 and headquarters for the Imperial Japanese forces stationed in Los Banos, Laguna. Believers claim of garrotted ghosts in the building. Other areas of claimed paranormal activities are the Men's Dormitory, Main Library, Student Union Building, a footbridge near the UPLB CEAT (destroyed by Typhoon Milenyo in 2006), and Pili Drive.

Negros Occidental
 Balay Negrense: Also known as Victor Gaston Ancestral House, it is a heritage site and a museum in Silay that was the home of a late-19th century sugar baron. Believing visitors claim of paranormal activities during their visits to the museum.

Negros Oriental
 Silliman University: A prestigious Presbyterian institution located in Dumaguete, the institution is reported to be haunted. It was used as a station for Japanese forces during the Second World War. Notable haunted structures include the Katipunan Hall as well as three dormitory buildings; Edith Carson Hall, Channon Hall, and Doltz Hall. Channon Hall was used by the Japanese Kempeitai as their headquarters and torture chamber while Katipunan Hall, built and opened in 1916, originated as Dumaguete Mission Hospital and acted as the main hospital of the university as well as the general hospital of the entire Dumaguete area and its border towns.

Pampanga

 Clark Air Base Hospital: Considered as the most haunted location in the Philippines, as it served as an asylum to the wounded (and dying) American soldiers during the Second World War and the subsequent Vietnam War. Ghost Hunters International visited the hospital in 2009, and confirmed the paranormal activities in the site. It is said to believe that people who visit the hospital and sleep within 8 hours after the visit, experience nightmares and intense lucid dreaming for a week.

Quezon

 Herrera Mansion: Also known as the Old Stone House, it is widely considered the oldest house of Tiaong, Quezon. It was designed by Tomás Mapua in 1920. Its original owners were Isidro and Juliana Herrera, but has been abandoned for many years ago and is now deteriorating due to decades of disuse. Believers claim of ghosts from the Japanese era.
 Mount San Cristobal: A mountain located in the municipality of Dolores. Believing natives claim that it emanates negative energy. It is the so-called 'evil' foil to the holy Mount Banahaw nearby.

Siquijor

 Siquijor: An island-province in Central Visayas, has been commonly associated with mystic traditions that the island's growing tourism industry capitalizes on. Its ties to faith healers and sorcery attracts and repulses visitors at the same time.

See also

 Ghosts in Filipino culture
 List of reportedly haunted locations
 Philippine mythical creatures

References

Lists of tourist attractions in the Philippines
 
Philippines